Aline Adriana Küppenheim Gualtieri (born 10 August 1969) is a Chilean film and television actress.

Early life and career 
Born to a French father and a Chilean mother, Küppenheim spent her early years traveling around different parts of Europe due to her parents' trade, both of whom were artisans. During this time, her interest in drawing also developed, as she used to draw with chalk on the streets of Paris while her parents worked.

In the early 1980s, Küppenheim returned to Chile and studied at La Girouette School in Las Condes. Later, she studied theater at Fernando González's academy-club.

Küppenheim made her telenovela debut in 1991 with the successful TV series Ellas por ellas on Canal 13, playing the role of Victoria "Vicky". She later moved to TVN and appeared in the teleseries Trampas y caretas and Jaquemate, where she landed her first significant role as one of the young protagonists of the story alongside Felipe Camiroaga.

Afterwards, Küppenheim returned to Channel 13 and appeared in several teleseries such as Champaña, El amor está de moda (where she made her debut as a singer interpreting the central theme of the show), Marron Glacé, el regreso, Eclipse de luna and Amándote. She then switched back to TVN, where she landed her first antagonistic role in the telenovela La Fiera, starring Claudia Di Girolamo. After the series ended, she decided to accompany her husband at the time, actor Bastián Bodenhöfer, to France, where he was appointed cultural attaché.

In 2004, Küppenheim returned to Chile and starred in Destinos cruzados and Entre medias. She was later signed by the production company Roos Film to star in the Chilean adaptation of Montecristo, which marked the end of her time in Mega. She also made a brief guest appearance in some episodes of Fortunato, the Chilean adaptation of a popular Argentine show.

On television, Küppenheim has also appeared in series such as JPT: Justicia para todos and Cárcel de mujeres 2.

In film, Küppenheim starred in Sangre de Cuba (Dreaming of Julia), where she shared the screen with actors such as Gael García Bernal and Harvey Keitel. Her performance in Machuca was highly praised, where she portrayed María Luisa Infante, a wealthy woman caught up in the changes brought about by the coup in Chile in 1973. In 2008, she won a Pedro Sienna Award for her role in Andres Wood's The Good Life. In 2011, she appeared in Prófugos as Prosecutor Ximena Carbonell. In 2014, she won an Altazor Award for Best Television Series Actress for her work in Ecos del desierto. In 2017, she stood out in her role in A Fantastic Woman, winner of the Academy Award for Best Foreign Language Film.

In 2022, Küppenheim starred alongside Claudia Di Girolamo in the Netflix series 42 Days of Darkness. In its opening week, the show climbed to the top of the streaming platform's list and settled into seventh place for the most successful non-English speaking series, accumulating 9.9 million hours viewed since its premiere. Later that year, she won the Best Actress award at the Tokyo International Film Festival for her leading role in Manuela Martelli's debut film, 1976.

Personal life 
Küppenheim was in a relationship with Álvaro Rudolphy and Luciano Cruz-Coke during the 1990s. Later, she married actor Bastián Bodenhöfer in 2000, with whom she has a son named Ian, born in the same year. However, their marriage ended in 2006.

After that, Küppenheim began a relationship with an Italian man named Renzo Melai, who died on June 23, 2008, after his motorcycle collided with a truck in Peñalolén, Chile. According to the newspaper La Tercera, Renzo had been working as an adventure tourism guide since he arrived in Chile in 2000.

Filmography

References

External links
 

1969 births
Living people
Actresses from Barcelona
Chilean film actresses
Chilean television actresses
Chilean people of German descent
20th-century Chilean actresses
21st-century Chilean actresses